Déou is a department or commune of Oudalan Province in northern Burkina Faso. Its capital lies at the town of Déou.

Towns and villages

References

Departments of Burkina Faso
Oudalan Province